Gráinne Mulvey (born 10 March 1966) is an Irish composer.

Biography
Mulvey was born in Dún Laoghaire, County Dublin, Ireland, and studied with Eric Sweeney at Waterford Regional Technical College, Hormoz Farhat at Trinity College Dublin and Agustín Fernández at Queen's University, Belfast. In 1999 she gained a DPhil in Composition at the University of York under the supervision of Nicola LeFanu. She currently holds the position of Professor of Composition at Technological University Dublin (formerly Dublin Institute of Technology) Conservatory of Music and Drama.

In April 2010, she was elected to membership of Aosdána, the State-recognised affiliation of creative artists in Ireland. A CD Akanos & Other Works, dedicated to her recent work, was released in February 2014 on the Navona label.

Style
Gráinne Mulvey's music is timbrally and rhythmically complex—a legacy of her work in the electroacoustic field. Her microtonally-inflected language derives ultimately from the natural harmonic series, placing her somewhat in the spectral tradition. As she herself has written:

My music is increasingly concerned with a sense of place – with the natural world and mankind’s relationship with that world.

I don’t look for the easy way out – I enjoy solving musical problems and relish a challenge. [Ibid]

A restless turbulence characterises much of her work, exploiting extremes of register, intricate polyrhythms and timbral exploration (including frequent use of "extended" techniques). Resolution, when eventually reached, is hard-won.

Career highlights
1994: Winner,  Composers' Class of the RTÉ Musician of the Future Competition with Rational Option Insanity for oboe, clarinet, horn, violin and piano.

1994: Étude No 1 for piano chosen to represent Ireland at the International Rostrum of Young Composers

1997: Awarded the Adjudicator's Prize at the Arklow Music Festival for Relentless for violin and piano

1998: Awarded the Macaulay Fellowship by the Arts Council of Ireland/An Chomhairle Ealaíon

1999: Winner, New Music for Sligo (Irish Section) with Maelstrom for string quartet.

1999: Sextet Uno and Rational Optional Insanity released on CD by Black Box Music

2001: Appointed Lecturer in Composition at Dublin Institute of Technology Conservatory of Music and Drama. Adjudicator, Composition section, Feis Ceol, Dublin

2003: Winner, St John Memorial University Composers' Competition with Latitude 50 for chamber orchestra.

2003: Appointed Head of Composition at DIT. Co-adjudicator, Markievicz Medal for Composition. Composer-in-residence, Mercy Convent, Waterford

2004: Jury member, Guido d'Arezzo International Composition Competition.

2004: Guest composer, Maynooth Composers' Summer School

2006: Scorched Earth chosen to represent Ireland at the ISCM International Rostrum of Composers

2007: Featured composer at RTÉ Horizons series - Scorched Earth, Akanos and Horizons Fanfare performed by Robert Houlihan and the RTÉ National Symphony Orchestra, National Concert Hall, Dublin

2008: Akanos included on CD Contemporary Music from Ireland, Vol. 7 click for details.

2008: Akanos selected for ISCM World Music Days 2008 in Vilnius - performed by the Lithuanian National Symphony Orchestra cond. Robertas Šervenikas click for details

2009: Akanos performed by the Filharmonie Hradec Králové, cond. Andreas S. Weiser as part of 2009 Prague Premières festival. click for details

2009: Stabat Mater selected for 2009 ISCM World Music Days, Sweden click for details

2010: Jury member, Guido d'Arezzo International Composition Competition

2011: Jury member, Guido d'Arezzo International Composition Competition

2012: Steel-grey splinters for solo piano, commissioned and performed by Matthew Schellhorn.

Bibliography
Benjamin Dwyer: "An Interview with Gráinne Mulvey", in: B. Dwyer: Different Voices. Irish Music and Music in Ireland (Hofheim: Wolke Verlag, 2014), p. 208–222.

References

External links
Official website
Profile
ISCM World Music Days 2008
"Akanos & other works" 
"Contemporary Music from Ireland, Vol. 7" 
 sanctuaryclassics.com

1966 births
21st-century classical composers
21st-century women composers
Alumni of the University of York
Alumni of Waterford Institute of Technology
Aosdána members
Irish classical composers
Irish women classical composers
Living people
People from Dún Laoghaire